Zam Rural District (also Romanized as "Zām" and "Zaam") is a rural district (dehestan) in Pain Jam District, Torbat-e Jam County, Razavi Khorasan Province, Iran. At the 2006 census, its population was 8,557, in 1,869 families.  The rural district has 16 villages.

References 

Rural Districts of Razavi Khorasan Province
Torbat-e Jam County